Sega Racing Studio (abbreviated as SRS; also known as Sega Driving Studio) was a computer and video game developer established in 2005 (based in Solihull, England) for the sole purpose of developing AAA Sega racing titles. The studio had radically expanded from a small group of people to a team of over 60 employees by the year 2007 drawing talent from other major British developers such as Rockstar Games, Rare, Codemasters, and Criterion Games.
Its mission statement was to create driving games for the Western market while paying homage to Sega's legacy in the genre and developing new racing IPs.

The development studio was aiming to become large enough to be able "to be a multi-sku, multi-game studio" and develop multiple titles at the same time. The team was called autonomous from Sega while still being part of the organization.

The studio was headed by Guy Wilday, who was involved in the Colin McRae Rally games and was formerly the head of the studio behind the games and the series producer.

Acquisition by Codemasters
On April 8, 2008, Sega announced the closure of Sega Racing Studio, although no reason was specified for the closure, it has been assumed it was due to lacklustre sales of Sega Rally Revo. At a later time, Sega announced none of the employees were folded into internal studios.

On April 25, 2008, Codemasters announced that it had acquired Sega Racing Studio.

When Grid 2 was announced, the studio was brought back up as Codemasters Racing.

Games developed
Sega Rally Revo  (2007)
Sega Rally 3  (2008)

References

External links
Sega Racing Studio's official website

Racing Studio
Video game development companies
Video game companies established in 2005
Video game companies disestablished in 2008
Defunct video game companies of the United Kingdom
Defunct companies based in the West Midlands (county)
Companies based in Solihull
2005 establishments in England
2008 disestablishments in England